A ripple effect is a situation where an effect from an initial state can be followed outwards incrementally.

Ripple Effect may refer to:
Ripple Effect (puzzle), a logic puzzle published by Nikoli
Ripple Effect project,  project to provide the poor with clean safe water started in 2009
"Ripple Effect" (Stargate SG-1), an episode from Season 9 of the science fiction television series Stargate SG-1
Flux Family Secrets: The Ripple Effect, hidden object puzzle-adventure casual game
7/7 Ripple Effect, 2007 film
Ripple Effect (film), a 2007 starring Forest Whitaker
"The Ripple Effect", a Season 8 episode of CSI: NY
Ripple Effect Studios, a video game developer and subsidiary of Electronic Arts